Noorpur Thal  (Thal,), is a city and headquarters of Noorpur Thal Tehsil, an administrative subdivision of Khushab District in the Punjab Province of Pakistan.

References

Union councils of Khushab District
Populated places in Khushab District